Núria Castelló (born 26 April 1971) is a Spanish backstroke swimmer who competed in the 1992 Summer Olympics.

References

1971 births
Living people
Spanish female backstroke swimmers
Olympic swimmers of Spain
Swimmers at the 1992 Summer Olympics
Mediterranean Games silver medalists for Spain
Mediterranean Games medalists in swimming
Swimmers at the 1991 Mediterranean Games